The Kennedys is a television miniseries chronicling the lives of the famous political  Kennedy family, including key triumphs and tragedies it has experienced. It stars Greg Kinnear, Barry Pepper, Katie Holmes, and Tom Wilkinson among others, and is directed by Jon Cassar. The series premiered in the United States in April 2011 on the Reelz Channel, on History Television in Canada and on the History Channel in the United Kingdom.

Cast

Main
Greg Kinnear as John F. "Jack" Kennedy
Barry Pepper as Robert F. "Bobby" Kennedy
Katie Holmes as Jacqueline Kennedy
Tom Wilkinson as Joseph P. Kennedy, Sr.
Diana Hardcastle as Rose Kennedy
Kristin Booth as Ethel Kennedy

Guest
Chris Diamantopoulos as Frank Sinatra
Charlotte Sullivan as Marilyn Monroe
Gabriel Hogan as Joseph P. Kennedy, Jr.
Ryan Blakely as Lee Harvey Oswald

Recurring
Serge Houde as Sam Giancana
Enrico Colantoni as J. Edgar Hoover
Don Allison as Lyndon B. Johnson
Rothaford Gray as Abraham Bolden
Ava Preston as Caroline Kennedy
Carson Reaume as David Kennedy

Production

Early criticism
The Kennedys was the subject of negative responses from historians based on early scripts, including charges of historical inaccuracy and presenting an unflattering depiction of the titular family. On February 16, 2010, the website stopkennedysmears.com was registered by filmmaker Robert Greenwald as part of the critical response to The Kennedys. On February 24, 2010 Dave Itzkoff of The New York Times reported that historian David Talbot, whose recent book had been used as source material for the miniseries, had joined those preemptively criticizing The Kennedys. Ted Sorensen (1928–2010), former presidential aide and speech writer for 35th President John F. Kennedy (1917–1963, served 1961–1963), described the script as a "character assassination". At the time of all of this criticism, the miniseries had not yet even been cast.

In an interview published in The Los Angeles Times on June 17, 2010, Joel Surnow addressed the complaints, saying, "they looked at early drafts of script that don't even resemble the final draft. It was way too early for them to comment on it." However, as the British newspaper The Daily Telegraph put it: "With Greg Kinnear as Mr. Kennedy, Katie Holmes as his First Lady and a budget of $30 million dollars, expectations had been high. Now, it is widely considered a disaster on the eve of its airing on the ReelzChannel beginning on Sunday. The History Channel decided to drop the series from its schedule in January 2011, stating that it was "not a fit" for the network. There then followed a humiliating and very public quest to find another channel that would air it."

Casting
Casting the main roles was announced on April 29, 2010 by director Cassar via his Twitter account. The miniseries was filmed in Toronto, Ontario, Canada between June and September 2010, and was produced by Canadian independent studio Muse Entertainment Enterprises and Joel Surnow's production company. The Kennedys is the first original scripted series made for History Television. The budget for The Kennedys was $25 million though reports later described it as a $30 million production. The miniseries was primarily written by Stephen Kronish, who previously worked with Surnow and Cassar on 24.

Historians associated with the production were Steven M. Gillon, author of the book The Kennedy Assassination – 24 Hours After, and Robert Dallek.

Broadcast history

Canada
On December 16, 2010, Shaw Media announced that there would be a special screening of the miniseries to be held on March 3, 2011 in Toronto. The Canadian Broadcasting Corporation reported on January 13, 2011 that Shaw Media would be showing The Kennedys in March 2011, but they were uncertain about whether it would remain on History Television or be moved to their broadcast network Global, or one of their other cable channels such as Showcase. The miniseries had been scheduled on History in two-hour segments at 9:00 pm beginning on March 6, 2011 and continuing for three subsequent Sundays. John Doyle, television critic for The Globe and Mail reported on January 26, 2011 that The Kennedys will be shown on History Television starting on March 9, 2011. Six days later, it was reported that Stan Hubbard, CEO of ReelzChannel, claimed that part of his acquisition deal for US rights would be worldwide premiere rights, forcing an uncertain delay in the originally announced television premiere in March 2011 on History Television in Canada. On February 1, 2011 Shaw Media announced its revised schedule for the miniseries, which was to be shown on History Television in four two-hour segments beginning on April 10, 2011.

United States
On January 7, 2011, the cable channel History announced that it would not show The Kennedys in the United States, stating "this dramatic interpretation is not a fit for the History brand."

Michael Prupas, president of Muse Entertainment and executive producer of the miniseries, issued a statement on January 10, in which he addressed the claims of inaccuracies: "The decision of the History Channel not to broadcast the show was made long after the executives of the Channel as well as the Channel's resident historian (who is a Kennedy expert) had read and approved all of the scripts and viewed and approved all of the final cuts of all of the episodes. Furthermore, our Errors and Omissions Insurer's attorneys reviewed all the scripts and edited episodes – and they have cleared all of the episodes for broadcast."

Director Jon Cassar said at the January 2011 Television Critics Association gathering in Los Angeles that he believed the reason the miniseries would not be shown by History and other US broadcasters was because powerful people within the United States connected to the Kennedy family took exception to it and used their political and other influence to prevent the showing.

Joel Surnow, the series' executive producer, attributed the cancellation to pressure exerted by the Kennedys on the board of History's owners, A&E Television Networks and The Walt Disney Company. Surnow stated: "It happened at the board level. I don't want to mention anyone by name. It's very simple to say that certain board members are friends with the Kennedys." Other reports pinpointed Kennedy family members Maria Shriver and Caroline Kennedy as the leaders of the campaign to stop the show, targeting Disney executive Anne Sweeney.

On January 12, Showtime passed on the US broadcasting rights for The Kennedys. Two days later it was reported that DirecTV's The 101 Network was considering acquiring the miniseries. Ten days later, on January 24, 2011, it was announced that The 101 Network also passed on airing the show. On February 1, 2011, ReelzChannel acquired US broadcast rights to The Kennedys and announced their intention to show the miniseries between April 3 and 10, 2011. Other US cable channels reported to have declined acquisition of the miniseries are FX and Starz.

Mediaweek reported that Hubbard Broadcasting, the owners of ReelzChannel, took a big risk in purchasing the rights to the miniseries by paying an estimated $7 million for the broadcast rights and spending an additional $10 million in advertising.

United Kingdom
In the United Kingdom, History UK was scheduled to screen the miniseries beginning on April 7, 2011. Tom Davidson, managing director of AETN-UK stated on the History website: "Securing the UK premiere of The Kennedys is a major coup for the History channel. Bringing to life the story of America's most iconic family, the drama is a bold and epic account of the Kennedy dynasty and we are delighted that viewers in the UK will get to see it on History first." Writing in The Daily Telegraph, TV director Sebastian Doggart commented:

Also in the UK, the BBC presented the series, beginning Friday, June 17, 2011, in both standard definition and HD.

Other countries 
 2011
The series began broadcasting in Serbia on B92 beginning on May 6, 2011; in Republic of Ireland on RTÉ One beginning on May 21, 2011; and in Australia on ABC1, beginning on May 22, 2011.

In Italy the series aired on History Channel starting on June 7, 2011, in France on France 3 in Summer 2011, Finland on YLE TV1 beginning on September 16, 2011, I n Ireland on RTÉ Two that same fall. In Spain Cosmopolitan Television started broadcasting the series on Jan 29, 2012.

In China, the series aired on LeTV.com in SD (Free VOD) and HD (Subscription VOD) beginning March 16, 2012, Slovakia on Jednotka beginning April 28, 2012, Germany on Arte on July 26, 2012. and in Indiaon History TV 18 that June. In Romania the miniseries aired on TVR1 in December 2013 and Sweden aired it on SVT in November 2013, 50 years after the assassination of President Kennedy.

Episodes

Critical reception

Canada
John Doyle of The Globe and Mail wrote, "it is awful – truly, mind-bogglingly tedious television." "The series (made in Canada with Muse Entertainment as the production company) looks cheap and sticks to the TV dramatics level of an afternoon soap opera." Doyle makes note of the predominantly Canadian cast and hopes they get a career boost but that the miniseries was "boosted by a fake controversy" and believes that "the American History Channel dropped it because it's bad TV."

United States
The miniseries met with a mixed reception from US critics. Based on 24 reviews from mainstream critics, it received an average score of 50/100 at Metacritic, indicating "mixed or average reviews".

Mark A. Perigard of the Boston Herald noted that there is no mention of Joseph and Rose Kennedy's other children, including the future Senator Ted Kennedy and Kathleen Cavendish, Marchioness of Hartington, and that it feels as though you are watching "through the prism of the Fringe universe". Perigard found it to be "an absorbing, addictive drama, with some authentic performances" but not history.
Alessandra Stanley of The New York Times wrote a joint review of The Kennedys and of The Borgias, which premiered the same day. In addressing the circumstances of the premiere she wrote, "There is something wonderfully Kennedyesque about a backroom campaign to discredit a series that claims the Kennedy White House had more than its share of backroom shenanigans." Stanley found the miniseries to be well made though at times cheesy, but that its strongest point is Tom Wilkinson as Joseph Kennedy, whom she describes, in tandem with Rodrigo Borgia, as "A ruthless, tyrannical striver (who) grasps for power, promoting his sons to establish his rule and cement his legacy".

Hank Stuever of The Washington Post found the miniseries "all ends up being as harmless as a game of Kennedy paper dolls" and the assassinations to be portrayed quite gently considering how violent Joel Surnow's show 24 is. Stuever describes the screenplay as clumsy and find the miniseries "sketches its characters with the precision of a fat Sharpie marker" and cautions those who recall the time that they may be troubled watching the story "through Surnow and company's mean-spirited gaze". In moving on to review Camelot, which premiered three days before The Kennedys, Stuever wrote, "If you check your calendar, we're nearing the 50th anniversary of JFK's death, which makes him, his family and Cabinet members as fair game as King Arthur, Guinevere, Merlin and the gang, who've had their stories updated, revised and pillaged for centuries now."

U.S. Nielsen ratings

United Kingdom ratings
In the UK, the series was shown on the History Channel in April 2011 and on BBC Two and BBC HD in June 2011. Public response were generally positive.

Awards and nominations

Home media
The Kennedys was released on DVD in the UK on July 18, 2011, and in the US and Canada on September 20, 2011.

As of October 2011, The Kennedys was available as an app, digital download on iTunes and on Netflix's streaming media service.

Sequel miniseries

Holmes reprised her role in The Kennedys: After Camelot, a four-part sequel released on April 2, 2017. She was also executive producer of the miniseries and directed an episode, with Jon Cassar returning to direct the remaining three episodes.

See also
Kennedy (miniseries)
Prince Jack
Hoover vs. The Kennedys
Young Joe, the Forgotten Kennedy
 Civil rights movement in popular culture
 Cultural depictions of John F. Kennedy
 Cultural depictions of Jacqueline Kennedy Onassis

References

External links 
 
 
  at History Television
  at History UK
  at ReelzChannel
 

2010s American drama television miniseries
2010s Canadian television miniseries
2011 American television series debuts
2011 American television series endings
2011 Canadian television series debuts
2011 Canadian television series endings
American biographical series
American political drama television series
Canadian political drama television series
Civil rights movement in television
Cultural depictions of Frank Sinatra
Cultural depictions of J. Edgar Hoover
Cultural depictions of Jacqueline Kennedy Onassis
Cultural depictions of John F. Kennedy
Cultural depictions of Lyndon B. Johnson
Cultural depictions of Marilyn Monroe
Cultural depictions of Robert F. Kennedy
Cultural depictions of Sam Giancana
Emmy Award-winning programs
English-language television shows
History (Canadian TV network) original programming
Primetime Emmy Award-winning television series
Reelz original programming
Television controversies in the United States
Television series based on actual events
Television series by Corus Entertainment
Television series by Muse Entertainment
Television series set in the 1930s
Television series set in the 1940s
Television series set in the 1950s
Television series set in the 1960s
Television shows set in Boston
Television shows set in Washington, D.C.
Works about Marilyn Monroe